is an Italian-Japanese anime series produced by Tatsunoko Productions, Mondo TV and NHK. It is an adaptation of the Alexandre Dumas version of the Robin Hood story consisting of 52 episodes. In this version, Robin and his allies are mostly pre-teens.

Overview
Robin's palace was burned to ashes by the order of Alwyn, the Baron of Nottingham. Robin and his cousins Will, Winifred and Jenny flee into Sherwood Forest, hoping to escape persecution.  They end up encountering a group of bandits led by Little John, who dubs himself as Big John during the beginning of the series, until Robin pokes fun renaming him "Little John" for playing with a pussycat. Together, Robin and the bandits must stop Baron Alwyn's persecutions and greed as well as to prevent the greedy and fat Bishop Hartford from adopting (marrying in the Japanese version) Marian Lancaster and obtaining her family's wealth.

Characters

Protagonists

 Robert Huntington or Robert Huntingdon, aka Robin Hood (voiced by Kazue Ikura) – The heir to the noble family of Huntington, Robin Hood's house is burned to the ground by the order of Baron Alwyn. He is forced to flee and hideout in Sherwood Forest where he and his cousins encounter Little John and his gang.
 Marian Lancaster (voiced by Naoko Matsui) – The descendant of the noble Lancaster family who is to be adopted by a greedy bishop named Hartford. She wears a golden cross around her neck as a symbol of her family and was her Mother's prized possession.  Marian was especially notable throughout the series for her evolution in character development.
 Will Scarlet (voiced by Yuko Mita) – Robin's friend/cousin who fight along his side when trouble arises. He has two sisters.
 Friar Tuck (voiced by Kenichi Ogata) – An old monk who lives on the edge of Sherwood Forest and helps Robin if needed. A recurring gag is that Friar Tuck is constantly trying to use his inventions to fly, but they never work.
 Little John (voiced by Bin Shimada) – A leader of a group of bandits who were forced to hide out in Sherwood Forest to avoid forced labor. Though he clashes with Robin at first, he proves to be an "invincible" ally. He has a love interest in Winifred.
 Much (voiced by Mayumi Tanaka) – Much is Little John's right-hand man.
 Winifred Scarlet (voiced by Maria Kawamura) – Robin's cousin and Will's sister.
 Jenny Scarlet, but called Barbara in the Japanese version (voiced by Sayuri Iketmoto) – Jenny is Robin's cousin, and the younger sister of Will and Winifred.
King Richard the Lionheart (voiced by Mugihito) – the true and rightful king of England.

Antagonists

Most of the antagonists of the series serve as only "temporary" antagonists who eventually start aiding the protagonists near the end of the series. However, all of them start off as those who oppose Robin through the majority of the series. It's only near the end due to some of them start to make a change for the better.

 Baron Alwyn (voiced by Masashi Ebara) – The Baron of Nottingham that taxes his workers and keeps them working for him. He is the one that orders the destruction of the Huntington's castle. He is based on the Sheriff of Nottingham in both character design and personality. Near the end of the series, due to Robin's constant thwarting and a near death experience by him, he starts to make a change for the better until coming across a plot that would allow him to take over the kingdom, thus, changing him back to his greedy, inconsiderate self. Once again, however, his plan of action is stopped by Robin as well as King Richard.
 Bishop Hartford (voiced by Yuu Shimaka) – A greedy bishop of Nottingham that is to adopt Marian Lancaster for the Lancaster's wealth. Like Alwyn, the Bishop eventually starts to make a change for the better towards the end of the series. Unlike Alwyn, he remains loyal to the protagonists in the end, and eventually helps out Robin by informing them Alwyn's plot to take over the kingdom.
 Gilbert (voiced by Toshihiko Seki) – A loyal and dangerous knight that serves under Baron Alwyn and does his bidding. He has a scar under his right eye, which is hidden by his long hair, from a very short fight with Robin in the first episode. During a fight with Robin he is blown off a cliff by the forces of nature along with Marian, but he uses his strength to help Robin save her, and ends up falling, believing to have died. It is discovered later that he survived the fall. He later becomes a knight for King Richard, and no longer serves under Baron Alwyn.
 Cleo (voiced by Chieko Honda) – Gilbert's sister, first introduced in episode 24 "The Girl in Black". She wears a black dress and has long dark hair. After Gilbert's supposed death early in the series, she is told by Alwyn that Robin was the cause. She plans to kill Robin and avenge the death of her older brother, despite he was not the cause of Gilbert's death. Later on, Cleo eventually finds out the truth and no longer tries to kill Robin, and the two form somewhat of a relationship (however, Robin's true feelings stay true to Marian).
 King John (voiced by Issei Futamata) – Upon discovering his heritage, Alwyn uses him to try to take over the kingdom. He himself follows the plan to become king and attempts to replace his brother, King Richard.
Guy of Gisbourne – A mercenary hired by Alwyn to kill Robin.  He is accompanied by two men known as The Viking and Hood.  He succeeds in capturing the outlaws, Robin Hood and his friends, but is thwarted when Much, who manages to avoid capture, realizes they made a grave mistake. Gisbourne and his goons plans are thwarted when they unknowledgeably ate a bunch of Laughing Cap Toadstools picked by Marian, Winifred and Jenny.

Music
The series uses two pieces of theme music for the Japanese version; one opening song and one ending song. The Japanese opening song is called "Wood Walker", and the Japanese ending song is called "Hoshizora no Labirinsu (星空のラビリンス lit.Labyrinth of the Starry Sky)", both sing by the Japanese vocalist Satoko Shimonari.

There are two English opening songs. One is called "Robin of the Forest", while another is an instrumental of "Wood Walker" used for the Interfilm video dub. The Italian dub, called simply Robin Hood, features an opening theme with words by Alessandra Valeri Manera and music by Carmelo "Ninni" Carucci, sung by the popular singer Cristina D'Avena; the French dub, called Les Adventures de Robin des Bois, uses the same tune sung by Alexis Tomassian. All the opening animations are kept the same, however, the ending animation differs depending on the international versions, for example, the Japanese ending is completely original whereas the German dub shows scenes from the series to a shortened instrumental theme of their composed opening.

Episodes
 "Birth of the Hero"
 "Mystery Forest"
 "A Duel"
 "House Building"
 "The Mercenary"
 "Gentlemen Bandits"
 "The Loyal King"
 "Towards Nottingham"
 "Friend or Foe"
 "Impossible"
 "An Uncertain Future"
 "Disguise"
 "Up in Smoke"
 "A New Day"
 "An Unexpected Return"
 "Fog and Wind"
 "The Ultimate Farewell"
 "Tuck's Battle"
 "Witchcraft"
 "Revenge"
 "King of the Forest"
 "Fire"
 "Thunderstorm in Nottingham"
 "The Girl in Black"
 "Love and Hate"
 "Peace After the Storm"
 "A Foundling"
 "The Flying Ship"
 "A Prediction"
 "Barons Greed"
 "The Bandits Revenge"
 "Jenny's Tale"
 "Return"
 "The Fog of Revenge"
 "The Good Old Days"
 "Gamekeeper"
 "Fire in the Forest"
 "The Treasury"
 "Reconciliation"
 "An Evil Being"
 "Traitor"
 "The Lake of Truth"
 "The Decisive Battle"
 "The Bad Luck Man"
 "A Charming Villain"
 "Unbeatable"
 "Honest Eyes"
 "Tragedy"
 "Prince of the Woods"
 "The Decision"
 "The Crowning"
 "Immortal"

References

External links
 Official anime website of Tatsunoko Production 
 

1990 anime television series debuts
1990 Japanese television series debuts
1992 Japanese television series endings
Italian children's animated adventure television series
Italian children's animated fantasy television series
Japanese children's animated adventure television series
Japanese children's animated fantasy television series
Adventure anime and manga
Drama anime and manga
Historical anime and manga
NHK original programming
Robin Hood television series
Television series set in the Middle Ages
Television shows set in England
Anime and manga based on fairy tales